William Okeley was a Puritan who was taken into slavery in Algeria between the years 1639–44, and who wrote a captivity narrative of the 17th century, entitled Ebenezer; or, a Small Monument of Great Mercy, Appearing in the Miraculous Deliverance of William Okeley, John Anthony, William Adams, John Jephs, John --, Carpenter, from the Miserable Slavery of Algiers with the Wonderful Means of Their Escape in a Boat of Canvas; the Great Distress and Utmost Extremeties Which They Endured at Sea for Six Days and Nights; [and] Their Safe Arrival at Mayork, with Several Matters of Remark During Their Long Captivity and the Following Providences of God Which Brought Them Safe to England..  Okeley published his narrative in 1675, nearly 30 years after his escape from Algiers.

Okeley was fleeing religious persecution and was on his way to the Puritan colony of Providence Island when his boat was captured by Algerian pirates.  During his time in Algiers, he served 4 different masters, and was forced into a variety of occupations, including childcare, working on the crew of an Algerian pirate ship, weaving, and, most importantly, running a business in the city selling alcohol and other goods.  Many slaves in Algiers were set loose within the city (whose walls acted as a prison) and forced to pay a monthly allowance to their masters.  Many, like Okeley, thrived by trading.  Eventually, Okeley and a group of his fellow slaves staged a daring escape by creating a boat with a canvas hull, smuggling it out of the city, and rowing themselves across the Mediterranean to the island of Mayork.

Unlike many Barbary slave narratives, Okeley constructed his in the form of a spiritual autobiography, and his narrative provides an important precursor to, and possible inspiration for, American Puritan captivity narratives, including the most well-known, that of Mary Rowlandson, who was captured by Native Americans in colonial Massachusetts during King Philip's War.

Providence Island and Colonization 

Providence Island is a small island located in the West Indies.  The island promised land for Puritans wanting to leave New England under the reign of King Charles I.  New England was overpopulated and restricted Puritan practices due to lingering hostility from other Catholic .  The land was beneficial for Puritan colonists who wanted to practice their religion without restriction, and supplied fertile soil for growing cotton and tobacco.

Labor of the land was relied on the enslaved African Americans that were either imported from New England, or purchased from Africa. "Slavery and colonization went hand in hand.  Without colonies to grow staple crops lie sugar, rice, and tobacco, and to proffer wealth in the form of valuable minerals, their would have been much less need for slave.  Without Indian and African slaves, there would have been no labor to grow the crops or extract those minerals--at least not labor cost-efficient enough to create the profits that made the whole system viable."

Puritans and Slavery 

Permanent servitude is described as a "natural hierarchy" Puritans believed to be "the bottom rung of a ladder that led all the way up to God."   "The Curse of Ham is the assumed biblical justification for a curse of eternal slavery imposed on Black people, and Black people alone."  Even though the Bible does not specifically describe certain race, such justification of Black slavery is strongly associated with the Curse of Ham:

"The sons of Noah who went forth from the ark were Shem, Ham, and Japheth, Ham was the father of Canaan.  These three were the sons of Noah; and from these the whole earth was peopled.  Noah was the first tiller of the soil.  He planted a vineyard; and he drank the wine, and became drunk, and lay uncovered in his tent.  And Ham, the father of Canaan, saw the nakedness of his father, and told his two brother outside.  Then Shem and Japheth took a garment, laid it upon both their shoulders, and walked backward and covered the nakedness of their father; their faces were turned away, and they did not see their father's nakedness.  When Noah awake from his wine and knew what his youngest son had done to him, he said, "Cursed be Canaan; a lave of slaves shall he be to his brothers."

Ham son, Canaan, is cursed for his father's sin.  Even though, Noah did not curse Ham and chose to curse Canaan, still effects the descendants of Ham.  "The spirit of prophecy would not curse the son that had been by God blessed along with [his brothers].  But since the punishment of the sin would cleave to the whole descent of the son that mocked at his father's nakedness, he made the curse originate with his son."

Slavery and Psychological Trauma 

In the 17th century the Barbary Coast implemented a system to force captives, like Okeley, into slavery.  After being captured, the captives were either locked below deck or put to work by the corsairs. These captives were beaten, lacked food and water, and lived in unsanitary conditions.  When the captive and corsairs arrived to their respective territories, the corsairs paraded the captives through the town. Residents of the town, Turks, Moors, Jews and renegades cheered and taunted as the captives and corsairs walked. For the corsairs, they were celebrating their new booty. The captives were humiliated and ashamed of their new status. The captives were in shock from the reversal of their fortunes.

Also, the captives were sometimes sent to the wealthy slave dealers or government officials to be introduced to older slaves. The older slaves shared information about society and servitude in the Barbary Coast. They helped the newcomers understand lingua franca  and lent them money. Also, they provided information about social customs like, kissing the hem of their master's robe. The veteran slaves helped the captives become less susceptible to anxiety or depression from these new experiences. However, these veterans were employed by their masters to gain information about the captives to demand higher sale prices or ransoms in the slave market.

Okeley recounts his experience at the slave market in his narrative. Okeley compares his experience to a slaughterhouse because he is treated like a beast. The maquignons (horse traders)  inspect the captives by looking at their teeth, limbs, hair, beard, and face. They inspect these body parts to determine if the captives are fit for labor. They inspect the limbs for any broken bones, dislocation, or any bone disease that are commonly found in horses. The maquigonins could not judge the age of the captives effectively. Age was important because, for a male slave it determines their work-ability and for a female if she is worth buying as a consort for a harem. Okeley's description is an example of dehumanization. The captives are treated like beast because they are inspected like horses by horse traders. This is the first of many of Okeley's traumatic experiences while captured in Algiers.

While enslaved in Algiers, Okeley is accused of attempting to escape by a spy. The spy sees Okeley near the shore with John Randal, another slave, and assumes they are planning an escape. Okeley and Randal were charged by the viceroy and his council with an attempt to escape. They were beaten with the batoon. Afterwards, they were chained and locked away in the viceroy's prison until their patrons came to receive them. After being delivered by his patron, Randal was given three hundred blows upon his feet. The spy that seized them demanded a payment from Okeley's patron. Okeley's patron ordered him to work in the looms. After Okeley is sold to his second patron, he begins a plan to escape. While he is preparing a sail for the boat, Okeley notices the spy that accused him of attempted escape. Okeley becomes anxious and begins to panic because he knows if he is caught and pleads guilty, he will face punishment. Slaves can roam the town without their patrons. However, a spy system is implemented  to force the slaves to comply. This is an example of the psychological coercive method called, monopolization of perception. The perpetrators limit their victims understanding of the world by monopolizing their attention. The spy system limits Okeley's perception and understanding of his new world. Okeley is constantly being watched which, causes anxiety.

References 

17th-century English writers
English memoirists
17th-century English Puritans
Rebel slaves
Year of birth missing
Year of death missing
Slaves from the Ottoman Empire
17th-century slaves
17th-century rebels
Slavery in Algeria